Angela Jurdak Khoury (September 24, 1915 - May 29, 2011) was a Lebanese diplomat and college professor based in Washington, D.C.

Early life
Angela Jurdak was born in Dhour El Choueir, in the Mount Lebanon Mutasarrifate (Modern day Lebanon) the daughter of Mansur Hanna Jurdak (1881-1964), a mathematician and astronomer on the faculty of the American University of Beirut, and Leah Abs Jurdak. Angela Jurdak attended the American Junior College for Women and then the American University of Beirut, completing undergraduate studies in 1937 and a master's degree in 1938, in sociology. Later in life, she earned a PhD in international relations, from American University in Washington D.C. 

As a young woman, Jurdak was a member of the Lebanese national tennis team, played piano in concerts, and was known as a long-distance swimmer.

Career
Angela Jurdak taught sociology at the American University of Beirut beginning in 1938, the university's first woman instructor. She served as assistant director of the Allied Powers Radio Poll for Syria, Lebanon, and Palestine during World War II. After the war, she joined the Lebanese delegation to the United Nations and was a member of the Legation of Lebanon based in Washington, D.C. She was the first woman diplomat from Lebanon. She was Lebanese consul in New York for a time, and served on the United Nations Commission on the Status of Women at its founding in 1946. She resigned from her work with the Lebanese Ministry of Foreign Affairs in 1966.

She was a professor of government at George Mason University from 1967 until she retired in 1982.

Honors
Angela Jurdak Khoury was awarded the National Order of the Cedar by the Lebanese government in 1959. The Angela J. Khoury Award for Outstanding Senior in Government and International Politics is awarded at George Mason University in her memory.

Personal life
Angela Jurdak married lawyer Shukri Issa Khoury in 1949. They had two sons, Philip and George. She was widowed when Shukry Khoury died in 1985. Angela Jurdak Khoury died in 2011, aged 95 years, in Washington D.C. She lived in her later years with her sister Salma Mansur Jurdak, also a diplomat based in Washington D.C.; Salma Jurdak died in 2017 at age 97.

References

External links

A photograph of Angela Jurdak in 1946, as part of the United Nations Commission on the Status of Women, with six other representatives including Minerva Bernardino of the Dominican Republic, Marie-Hélène Lefaucheux of France, and Bodil Begtrup of Denmark.

Further reading
Marie Aziz Sabri, Pioneering Profiles: Beirut College for Women (Khayat Books 1967). (Includes an entry on Angela Jurdak Khoury.)

1915 births
2011 deaths
Lebanese diplomats
American University of Beirut alumni
George Mason University faculty
Lebanese emigrants to the United States